SMK Bukit Mewah (SMRJL) is a public secondary school situated in Jalan Tok Ungku, Seremban, in Malaysia. The school has approximately 129 teachers and a student body of 2546 students.

History
The school was opened on 11 November 1983 as Loop Road Primary School by Dato 'Rais Yatim, Minister of Land cum Acting Minister At that time, SMRJL had only two building blocks, Block Efficiency and Block Fadilah. There were 13 classrooms, two laboratories, an office and a staff room. At that time there was only 14 teachers and 310 students

In 1984, the school started morning and afternoon sessions. In 1986 the Parent Teachers Association (PTA) helped build Block Harmony, which contained four classrooms. In 1990, Block Glorious was erected and the name changed to Loop Road Secondary School (SMK JL).

In 1999, the school name was changes to Luxury Hill High School. 

On  6 April 2004, the House of Luxury Series was inaugurated by Dato'Utama Haji Mohammad Bin Haji Hasan, Minister of State. In 2005 two computer labs and a hall porch was also built.
After that, a boxing arena, library, training centre, parking and implement landscape were built. The school now had 10 blocks with 2453 students and 113 teachers.

Co-curricular achievements
SMK Bukit Mewah has sent participants to track and field. meets,  Wushu and Taekwondo competitions annually. 
The school also has Karate-Do, swimming, water polo, tenpin bowling, ping pong, chess, handball and badminton.

In the NST-RHB Spell-it-Right State challenge 2015, a student won 1st prize and was chosen to represent the state of Negeri Sembilan to the National Challenge, where she emerged as the 2nd prize winner. 
For the district level English Drama Competition, the school was  the 2nd prize winner. 
Two of SMK Bukit Mewah students have also excelled in The Queen's Commonwealth Essay Contest, in which they obtained a Gold and Bronze award.

In the District Choir Competition, the school choir team successfully emerged in 3rd place. Marching Competitions (Kawad Kaki) for the uniform bodies also has a consistent record of victory in district and state levels. In 2015, SMK Bukit Mewah emerged as the 3rd-place winner in the Asian Young inventors competition and has equal success in the international competition by obtaining the 3rd prize. In the Mighty Minds Challenge 2015, one of the teams was 2nd prize winner for the Upper Secondary category.

References

Secondary schools in Malaysia